Maurice "Moe" Purtill (May 4, 1916 – March 9, 1994), was an American swing jazz drummer, best known as the drummer  for the Glenn Miller Orchestra from 1939 to 1942.

Career
Born in Huntington, New York, Purtill dropped out of high school and started his career as a freelance drummer in New York Studios. At the age of 20, he was with the band of Red Norvo at the beginning of 1936. Later he joined Mildred Bailey. He played briefly with Miller in 1937, then worked with Tommy Dorsey in 1938-39 before picking up with Miller again from 1939-1942, when Miller had the bulk of his hits. After the breakup of Miller's band in 1942, Purtill played with Kay Kyser until 1944, then joined the U.S. Navy. After his discharge, he played briefly in 1946 with the reformed Glenn Miller Orchestra directed by Tex Beneke.

Purtill went on to record in the studio on various projects. He participated in a few Miller reunions, although he did not like to discuss his time in the band. He was good friends with Buddy Rich,  Trigger Alpert and saxophonist Jack Palmer. Purtill lived in New York City until the early 1970s when he moved to Sarasota, Florida. Moe Purtill retired in 1978. He died at Valley Hospital in Ridgewood, New Jersey.

Movie appearances
Moe Purtill appeared in the following movies in 1941 and 1942:
Sun Valley Serenade (1941)
Orchestra Wives (1942)

References

Sources
Flower, John (1972). Moonlight Serenade: a bio-discography of the Glenn Miller Civilian Band. New Rochelle, NY: Arlington House. .
Simon, George Thomas (1980). Glenn Miller and His Orchestra. New York: Da Capo paperback. .
Schuller, Gunther (1991). The Swing Era: The Development of Jazz, 1930–1945, Volume 2. New York: Oxford University Press. .
Scott Yanow, [ Moe Purtill] at Allmusic

1916 births
1994 deaths
American jazz drummers
People from Fair Lawn, New Jersey
20th-century American drummers
American male drummers
20th-century American male musicians
American male jazz musicians
Glenn Miller Orchestra members